Maria Kusion-Bibro (18 July 1936 – 9 January 1996) was a Polish sprinter. She competed in the women's 100 metres at the 1956 Summer Olympics.

References

1936 births
1996 deaths
Athletes (track and field) at the 1956 Summer Olympics
Athletes (track and field) at the 1960 Summer Olympics
Polish female sprinters
Polish female long jumpers
Olympic athletes of Poland
Place of birth missing